Puzeh-ye Tiz Ab Safer (also Romanized as Pūzeh-ye Tīz Āb Şafer; also known as Pūzeh-ye Tīz Āb and Tīz Āb) is a village in Chin Rural District, Ludab District, Boyer-Ahmad County, Kohgiluyeh and Boyer-Ahmad Province, Iran. At the 2006 census, its population was 13, in 4 families.

References 

Populated places in Boyer-Ahmad County